Crescent Lodge also known as the Bowery Beach School is an historic schoolhouse in Cape Elizabeth, Maine, United States. Built in 1855 and used as a schoolhouse until 1930, it was then transferred to the Ladies Union, a local social club. In 1984, the building was transferred to the Cape Elizabeth Lions Club. According to Greater Portland Landmarks, it is "one of the last remaining schoolhouses that characterizes the bygone era of one room schoolhouses..." It was added to the National Register of Historic Places in June 2018.

See also
National Register of Historic Places listings in Cumberland County, Maine

References

Former school buildings in the United States
Defunct schools in Maine
School buildings completed in 1855
Cape Elizabeth, Maine
One-room schoolhouses in Maine
School buildings on the National Register of Historic Places in Maine
National Register of Historic Places in Cumberland County, Maine
1855 establishments in Maine